The Southern African Regional Universities Association was established in 2005 as a membership based association for the 66 public universities in the 15 countries of the Southern African Development Community (SADC).

SARUA aims to assist in the general revitalization of higher education in Southern Africa and specifically to enhance and build the senior leadership capacity of SADC Higher Education institutions, thus enabling the sector to effectively respond to regional development challenges.

Since its inception SARUA has undertaken a number of baseline research studies in the region to investigate key higher education issues facing the public universities in Southern Africa, including size and shape issues, funding issues, open access and science and technology and ICT.

Members 
 Agostinho Neto University
 Bindura University of Science Education
 Cape Peninsula University of Technology
 University of Botswana
 Copperbelt University
 Eduardo Mondlane University
 Great Zimbabwe University
 University of Cape Town
 Central University of Technology
 Chinhoyi University of Technology
 University of Dar es Salaam
 University of Fort Hare
 University of the Free State
 University of Goma
 University of Johannesburg
 University of Kinshasa
 University of Lubumbashi
 University of KwaZulu-Natal
 University of Limpopo
 University of Malawi
 University of Mauritius
 University of Technology, Mauritius
 Midlands State University
 Mzumbe University
 Mzuzu University
 Nelson Mandela Metropolitan University
 National University of Lesotho
 National University of Science and Technology, Zimbabwe
 University of Namibia
 North-West University
 Open University of Tanzania
 Pedagogical University
 University of Pretoria
 Rhodes University
 University of South Africa
 Sokoine University of Agriculture
 Stellenbosch University
 University of Swaziland
 University of Venda
 Walter Sisulu University for Technology and Science
 University of the Western Cape
 University of the Witwatersrand
 University of Zambia
 University of Zimbabwe
 Zimbabwe Open University
 University of Zululand
 Unicaf University

See also
 Universities in Africa

External links
 Official website

Education in Southern Africa
College and university associations and consortia in Africa